Forest Hill railway station is a closed railway station on the Main Line railway in Queensland, Australia. It served the town of Forest Hill in the Lockyer Valley Region.

Description 
The railway station originated as a siding to service the property of AJ Boyd beginning in 1880. The siding was initially called Boyd's Siding, but later changed its name to Forest Hill, the name of Boyd's property. Forest Hill was recorded as a railway station in 1881 and was moved one kilometer west to its present location in 1886. The importance of rail transport for shipping produce had significantly declined during the 1960s. The railway station closed on 31 July 1992.

A small, disused portion of the waiting building and station remain. Four large concrete grain silos to the west end of the station are used by occasional freight trains.

References

Disused railway stations in Queensland
Main Line railway, Queensland
Forest Hill, Queensland